Scattergood Generating Station is an electricity-generating facility in the Playa Del Rey area of Los Angeles, California, in proximity to El Segundo and LAX. Scattergood has an 830 MW capacity spread across three steam turbine units. Owned and operated by the Los Angeles Department of Water and Power (LADWP), the station is a coastal landmark of the Santa Monica Bay in southern California. 

One writer described Scattergood and similar plants as “steel T. Rexes” hovering over southern California’s “finest beaches.” Another local journalist wrote that the presence of the “large, noisy” generating station discouraged tourism at adjacent beaches.  

Construction on the  site began in the late 1950s. The power plant, which cost $65 million, was named for Ezra F. Scattergood, first chief electric engineer of the Los Angeles municipal power system. Units 1 and 2 were brought online in 1958 and 1959, respectively; Unit 3 came online in 1974 with a potential 460 MW output. 

Circa 1964, the entire plant could be operated with as few as six staffers. As of 1971, Unit 3 was projected to cost an additional $68 million but provide power for 10 percent of the city. Between 2013 and 2015, the Department of Water and Power replaced the original Unit 3 “with a highly efficient combined cycle (natural gas and steam) turbine and two simple-cycle turbines.”

The power source for the plant is currently natural gas; the Los Angeles City Council is considering a long-term plan to shift to hydrogen. Waste gas from the neighboring Hyperion sewage treatment plant was used during the 1960s. The plant cycles through  of seawater daily as coolant. The seawater cools the freshwater that is turned to steam and back again; the steam turns the turbines that generate the electricity. The seawater is released back into the ocean  cooler than when it was removed. 

The plant’s electricity production was considered “extremely stable” circa 1977. Output is transmitted through an intertie line.

Public safety
In 1996, a scuba diver said to be looking for lobsters at night was sucked into the intake pipe of the plant. He was not harmed due to steel bars between the basin and pumps.

References 

Natural gas-fired power stations in California
Buildings and structures in Los Angeles County, California
Energy infrastructure completed in 1959
1959 establishments in California